Ayman Cherkaoui is an international jurist in Climate change law, Executive Director of the United Nations Global Compact in Morocco, and Lead Counsel for Climate Change at the Centre for International Sustainable Development Law in Montreal Quebec, Canada. Cherkaoui in 2017 was named to the Emerging Leaders Program at the  Policy Centre for the New South, and in 2018 was named to the Obama Foundation Leaders: Africa Program.

Education

Cherkaoui completed his undergraduate and graduate studies in Montreal receiving a Bachelor of Mechanical Engineering at McGill University, and a Bachelor of Laws from Université de Montréal Faculty of Law. Cherkaoui also later received a Master of Science from EMLYON Business School in Lyon, France. In addition, Cherkaoui has completed an Adaptation Certificate from University of Oxford, and a Business Sustainability Management Certificate from University of Cambridge.

Professional career

Cherkaoui has served as special advisor for Climate Change and Negotiations to the Minister of the Environment, Morocco, special advisor to the UNFCCC COP22 Presidency, and as a Climate Change Expert with Deutsche Gesellschaft für Internationale Zusammenarbeit (GIZ). Previously, Cherkaoui has worked as a consultant for VALYANS Consulting, International Air Transport Association, and Air Liquide.

His work focuses on technical negotiations under the UNFCCC and legal innovations to support adaptation and mitigation in climate vulnerable countries.

Publications
Cherkaoui contributed to a number of scholarly articles and technical reports.

References

Selected recordings
"La jeunesse africaine doit s’approprier le pouvoir de décision" (Fr), Matin
"COP22’s Ayman Cherkaoui on the road from Paris to Marrakesh", Center for International Forestry Research (CIFOR)
"COP 23 : Quels moyens de financement pour les projets liés à l'adaptation climatique?" (Fr), Matin

Living people
Year of birth missing (living people)
Emlyon Business School alumni
International environmental law
Environmental lawyers
Université de Montréal Faculty of Law alumni
McGill University Faculty of Engineering alumni
21st-century Moroccan lawyers
Climate change in Morocco